Olena Zamyrivna Shkhumova (born 24 November 1993 in Lviv) is a Ukrainian luger. She participated at 2014 and 2018 Winter Olympics.

Career
Shkhumova's first World Cup season was in 2011–12. She wasn't leader of the national team but she succeeded to qualify for 2014 Winter Olympics along with Olena Stetskiv. In the women's singles she placed last - 31st. She was also a part of the Ukrainian relay team, which finished 11th.

In 2016–17 season she improved her performances and became leader of Ukrainian team. At 2017 World Championships she was 22nd. As of January 2018, Shkhumova's best Luge World Cup finish was 20th in 2016–17 in Park City, United States.

On December 27, 2017, Olena Shkhumova qualified for 2018 Winter Olympics. She was 21st in singles race and 13th in team relay.

Personal life
Olena graduated from Lviv State University of Physical Culture.

Career results

Winter Olympics

World Championships

European Championships

Luge World Cup

Rankings

References

External links

 
 
 

1993 births
Living people
Ukrainian female lugers
Olympic lugers of Ukraine
Lugers at the 2014 Winter Olympics
Lugers at the 2018 Winter Olympics
Sportspeople from Lviv